Khaled Yashruti (1937 in Akko, Mandatory Palestine – 1970 in Beirut, Lebanon) was a Palestinian political activist and a leading member of the PLO.

The Right wing of Fatah
Beyond the Bagdad-oriented Ba'ath Party-linked Arab Liberation Front (ALF), there were some high-ranking members of Fatah itself who were heavily influenced by the original/non-Marxist Pan-Arab doctrine of the Ba'ath.

These people rejected the Soviet Union and Arab states close to it (The pro-Syrian Ba'ath, Algeria, Libya and South Yemen). They resented Yasser Arafat's rapprochement with Moscow and the PLO's progressive drift towards "third-worldist" leftwing rhetoric.

They were viewed as the "conservative" rightwing of Fatah. Many were members of the Galilean/Northern Palestinian aristocracy (such as Khaled Yashruti's father, who was the hereditary Shaykh of the Shadhiliyya Sufi brotherhood in pre-1947 Palestine). Most had studied in the US or at the American University of Beirut in the late 1950s.

Involvement in the PLO 
Khaled Yashruti progressively became their leader in the mid-1960s, and became a member of the PLO leadership in 1968, two years before Fatah's commanders were expelled to Lebanon from Jordan. Yashruti's faction had the backing of the Al-Bakr/Saddam Hussein Ba'athist government in Baghdad and was generally favorable to US involvement in the Middle-East as a counterweight to the growing influence of the USSR and Israel.

In parallel to his political activities, Khaled worked as a civil engineer and real estate entrepreneur in Lebanon. He died in 1970 in an accident- a huge crane fell on him while he was inspecting construction works in downtown Beirut. Some Palestinian and Lebanese journalists argued this was not an accident, but murder.

External links
 “Another Battle of Beirut ” (Time Magazine, May 14, 1973)
 “The Shadhiliyya Zawiyat ”
 “The Palestinian Fedayeen” (Declassified CIA Report, 1971)

References

1937 births
1970 deaths
Arab Liberation Front politicians
Arab Socialist Ba'ath Party – Lebanon Region politicians
Fatah members
Members of the National Command of the Ba'ath Party
Palestinian Arab nationalists
Palestinian Sunni Muslims